Sir Norman Henry Pownall Whitley,  (29 June 1883 – 12 April 1957) was a British Army officer and supreme court judge. He was a silver medallist in lacrosse at the 1908 Summer Olympics.

Biography
Whitley was born in Chorlton, Manchester and educated at Emmanuel College, Cambridge. He entered the Inner Temple to study law and was called to the bar in 1907.

In the 1908 Summer Olympics hosted by Great Britain Whitley was a member of the British Lacrosse team which went on to win a silver medal, losing to Canada in the final. 
 
On the outbreak of the First World War, he was commissioned into the Manchester Regiment and after basic training was sent to Gallipoli, where he was awarded the Military Cross. After evacuation from Gallipoli he served in Palestine and Arabia and was demobilized in 1920 with the rank of Major.

Returning to the legal profession he was appointed a Deputy Public Prosecutor in Penang in 1920 but soon afterwards (1922) transferred to the Straits Settlements (Singapore) in the same capacity. There in 1929 he was appointed a Puisne Judge and then Judge and Acting Chief Justice for the Federated Malay States. Finally, in 1937, he was appointed Chief Justice of Uganda, serving until his retirement in 1947. He was knighted KCB in 1941. He was latterly Chairman of the Uganda Cotton Industry Commission.

He married Florence May Erskine and had 5 children. His son Peter married Lady Mary Cambridge.

References

External links
Norman Whitley's profile at Sports Reference.com
Sale of his medals

1883 births
1957 deaths
Alumni of Emmanuel College, Cambridge
Members of the Inner Temple
Lacrosse players at the 1908 Summer Olympics
Olympic lacrosse players of Great Britain
Olympic silver medallists for Great Britain
People from Chorlton-cum-Hardy
Recipients of the Military Cross
Knights Companion of the Order of the Bath
Medalists at the 1908 Summer Olympics
Federated Malay States judges
Uganda Protectorate judges
Straits Settlements people
Manchester Regiment officers
British Army personnel of World War I
Lawyers from Manchester
Military personnel from Manchester